Iseyin is a town located in  Oyo, Nigeria. Iseyin is centrally located and accessible via road networks from Ibadan, Oyo, Abeokuta, and Ogbomoso. There are expanses of land which can be used for industrial, agricultural and institutional purposes in and around the city. The title of the monarch of Iseyin is "The Aseyin of Iseyin". There are a lot of educational institutions in Iseyin out of which are Ladoke Akintola University of Technology Iseyin campus, Polytechnic like SAF Polytechnic, Secondary Institutions like Kelani College Iseyin, Greater Love Model etc. which has since recorded a large amount of distinction in the WASSCE & SSCE results.

Education
The city houses College of Agriculture and Renewarable Natural Sciences of Ladoke Akintola University of Technology, Iseyin campus. The city also has a private Polytechnic named SAF Polytechnic, Iseyin, a Government Technical College and the Oyo state NYSC (National Youth Service Corps) permanent orientation camp.

The city has a number of reputable  secondary schools like SAF Poly International School, Kelani College Iseyin, Saint Thomas College, Greater Love Model College, Iseyin District Grammar School, Ansarudeen Grammar School, Muslim Grammar School. To mention a few. Kelani College Iseyin happened to be ranked the best secondary school in the whole of Iseyin and Oke Ogun due to the consistent academic success of their students in various external examinations like WASSCE & NECO and in various National competitions.

Iseyin also has an ultra modern private Digital Library named Raji Oke-Esa Memorial Library, the library was commissioned by the Nigeria former president, General (Rtd.) Olusegun Obasanjo, and Ebedi Writers’ Residency situated at the hill-side of Barracks area of the city. This International Residency has brought great writers, journalists and authors all over the world including Africa's first Nobel Laurel, Prof. Wole Soyinka, Jumoke Verissiomo, Funmi Aluko, Richard Ali, Paul Liam and others.

Industry
Iseyin is the headquarters of Oke-Ogun zone of Oyo state. A Sugar Cane Processing Company was established in the city.The primary industry of the area is cotton-based textiles. Iseyin is the fourth largest city in Oyo state, after Ibadan, Ogbomoso and arguably Oyo. Iseyin is also known as the home of Aso Òkè. Aso Òkè or Òfì is a popular traditional fabric mostly used for ceremonies amongst the Yoruba people of Nigeria. 

Other industries located in Iseyin include:

·Cympul Organic Agrofood, Iseyin-Oyo road

·Oyo Sugar Processors Limited, Iseyin

·McAgric International, Km8 Iseyin-Ibadan expressway

·Psaltry Mechanized Agriculture industrial hub is located in Iseyin.

·Friesland Campina (Wamco) has a milk processing center in the city. Wamco is a company that produces peak milk.

Agriculture
Tobacco is grown in Iseyin, amongst other food and cash crops, it is as a result of this that a big tobacco company - British American Tobacco - has a "leave office" in the city. Iseyin is part of the Oke-Ogun towns referred to as the “food basket’’ of Nigeria.

Because of sustainable annual rainfall in the area, the major agricultural activities are farming, hunting, fishing, and food processing, among others. Iseyin produces virtually all farm produces such as yam, maize, cassava, plantain among many others.

Ikere Gorge dam
Ikere Gorge dam is located in the city, it was said to be the second largest dam when it was discovered alongside Kanji dam during President Obasanjo's regime (Military). Ikere gorge dam is a man-made dam, It is a source of water for communities in Iseyin and its suburbs. During rainy season, the dam swells to full capacity. Tons of fish are produced from the dam, which can be a source of IGR for the government. The dam when maintained, is capable of generating electricity for the whole South-West states of Nigeria. The dam can be used for irrigation and tourist center.

Traditional weaving 
The primary industry of Iseyin is cotton-based textiles, and Iseyin reputed as the home of Aso Ofi or Aso Oke, a popular traditional fabric worn on special occasions by the Yoruba usually for coronation, chieftaincy, wedding engagement, festivals, naming ceremony, and other important events.

The maiden Aso-Ofi festival was observed on September 27, 2016, during World Tourism Day. The festival was conceptualized to showcase and celebrate a locally made fabric in Oyo State.

Notable people 

Professor Peller, magician
Ahmed Raji Senior Advocate of Nigeria
Olukayode Ariwoola, Chief Justice of Nigeria
Shina Peller, businessman and Politician

Popular places in Iseyin 

Aseyin Palace
Iseyin City Hall
Peller
Koso
Barracks
Ijemba
Atoori
Isalu
Ekunle
Custom
Odoomu
Oja Oba
Oja Agbe 
Oke Oremoje
Agip
Itan
Saw Mill Abaletu
Ilabe

 Ogunbado
Olokoyo

References

Local Government Areas in Oyo State
Cities in Yorubaland
Cities in Nigeria